The 2003 Armenian First League is the 13th season of the Armenian First League. It started on 1 May and ended 14 November. FC Kilikia from Yerevan became the league champions, and were promoted to the 2004 Armenian Premier League.

Overview
 Newly created FC Vagharshapat are introduced to the league.
 FC Dinamo Yerevan and Yerazank FC returned to professional football. 
 Spartak Yerevan FC merged with FC Banants and was dropped to the First League as a result.

Participating clubs

League table

Top goalscorers

See also
 2003 Armenian Premier League
 2003 Armenian Cup
 2003 in Armenian football

References

External links
 RSSSF: Armenia 2003 - Second Level

 

Armenian First League seasons
2
Armenia